The name Deling has been used for nine tropical cyclones in the Philippines by PAGASA in the Western Pacific Ocean.

 Typhoon Judy (1966) (T6603, 03W, Deling) – Southern Taiwan bore the brunt of Judy's impact; a U.S. Navy aircraft crashed in the storm
 Typhoon Olga (1970) (T7002, 02W, Deling) – an intense typhoon that caused heavy damages in Japan and South Korea
 Typhoon Gilda (1974) (T7408, 09W, Deling) – a deadly and destructive typhoon that struck Japan and South Korea
 Tropical Storm Shirley (1978) (T7805, 05W, Deling) – hit Vietnam as a tropical storm
 Tropical Storm Val (1982) (T8206, 08W, Deling) – a short-lived storm east of Taiwan; considered a continuation of Tess by the Japan Meteorological Agency
 Typhoon Nancy (1986) (T8605, 05W, Deling) – a Category 1 typhoon that hit Taiwan then passed off the coast of China and South Korea
 Tropical Storm Robyn (1990) (T9007, 08W, Deling) – a long-living tropical storm that caused minor impacts in South Korea and the Russian Far East
 Tropical Depression Deling (1994) (04W) – a short-lived cyclone off the Paracel Islands
 Typhoon Rex (1998) (T9804, 06W, Deling) – a Category 4 typhoon that stayed out at sea east of Japan, but brought heavy flooding to Honshu

Pacific typhoon set index articles